Andrea Bruno (born 11 January 1931 in Turin) is an Italian architect who specializes in conserving historic sites and museums.

Biography 
Bruno completed his studies at the Architectural Faculty of the Istituto tecnico in Turin in 1956. He specialized in the field of architectural conservation of historic buildings, museums and public sites. Among the projects led by Bruno are the Castle of Rivoli, Bagrati Cathedral, the Museum of Modern Art in Rivoli, the Faculty of Economics at the University of Turin, the Brigittines Theatre in Belgium and Château de Lichtenberg in France.

Bruno has been a consultant for UNESCO since 1974 in several missions in the Middle East and in Europe.

Exhibitions 
 Architetture nel tempo, Castello Cinquecentesco, Italy (2003).
 Fare, disfare, rifare architettura, Venice, Italy (2014).
 Designing the existent – from the Castle of Rivoli to the Bagarati Cathedral (2015).

Works  
 Museum of Nothing, The archeological museum of Maa-Palaiokastro, Coral Bay, Paphos, Cyprus (1987).

Publications 
 The citadel and the minarets of Herat, Afghanistan, Torino, Sirea, 1976.
 Il castello di Rivoli. 1734-1984, storia di un recupero, Torino, U. Allemandi, 1984.
 Architetture tra conservazione e riuso. Progetti e realizzazioni di Andrea Bruno a Torino, Milano, Lybra immagine, 1996.
 Il Castello di Grinzane Cavour. Un'architettura fortificata tra le vigne di Langa, (with Luigi Cabutto and Giulio Parusso), Alba, Ordine dei cavalieri del tartufo e dei vini di Alba, 2000.
 Museo della Lambretta. Storia e memoria, territorio e paesaggio, Soveria Mannelli, Calabria Letteraria, 2007.

References

External links 
 Derek Linsrum, "An interview with Andrea Bruno", icomos.org, retrieved 30 November 2016.

Conservation architects
Architects from Turin
1931 births
Living people